Pompeia Magna (born 80/75 BC – before 35 BC) was the daughter and second child born to Roman triumvir Pompey the Great (Gnaeus Pompeius Magnus) from his third marriage, to Mucia Tertia. Her elder brother was Gnaeus Pompeius and her younger brother was Sextus Pompey.

Biography
Pompeia was born and raised in Rome.  In 59 BC, her father Pompey married for a fourth time, to Julia Caesaris, the daughter of Julius Caesar. After their marriage, Pompeia was betrothed to a Servilius Caepio, but she instead married Faustus Cornelius Sulla, a politician who was the son of Roman dictator Lucius Cornelius Sulla from his wife Caecilia Metella. Around 47 BC, Faustus died in the African War against Julius Caesar. Their two sons fell into the hands of Julius Caesar, however Caesar dismissed them as a danger and pardoned them.

After 46 BC, Pompeia married for a second time to politician Lucius Cornelius Cinna who was consul in 32 BC.

For a time Pompeia accompanied her younger brother Sextus Pompey to Sicily. It was in Sicily that Pompeia made various presents for the young future emperor, Tiberius, who had fled with his parents there from Octavian. Pompeia gave Tiberius such presents as a cloak, a brooch, and a gold bulla. The historian Suetonius states that these presents were preserved and were exhibited in Baiae in his time. Sextus Pompey survived Pompeia when she died, sometime before 35 BC.

Children
 First marriage to Faustus Cornelius Sulla.
 Faustus Cornelius Sulla
 Possibly a daughter who married Quintus Aemilius Lepidus
 Second marriage to politician Lucius Cornelius Cinna.
 Gnaeus Cornelius Cinna Magnus, consul in AD 5
 Magna, who possibly married a Lucius Scribonius Libo

References

Sources
 Suetonius – The Lives of the Twelve Caesars – Tiberius
 Microsoft Encarta Encyclopaedia 2002

70s BC births
30s BC deaths
1st-century BC Roman women
1st-century BC Romans
Children of Pompey